St Nicholas Abbey is located in Saint Peter, Barbados, and is a plantation house, museum and rum distillery. Colonel Benjamin Berringer built the house in 1658. This house is one of only three genuine Jacobean mansions in the Western Hemisphere. It's similar to the English Jacobean-era manor houses of the first half of the seventeenth century, the period between the Tudor and Georgian styles, beginning in the reign of James I.

History 

St Nicholas Abbey has no church connection, it has always been a sugarcane plantation house. The exact origin of its name is not known but rumour has it that it was named after George Nicholas, husband to Berringer's granddaughter, Susanna.

Berringer was killed in a duel with his neighbor, Sir John Yeamans, who then married Berringer's widow and claimed the abbey as his property. In 1669, the Colonel's children took the matter to court and were awarded ownership of the property. Sir John and his wife then moved to British America, where they helped found South Carolina. The house was later acquired by the eminent baronet, planter and legislator, Sir John Gay Alleyne, through his marriage to Christian Dottin. He lived there from 1746 until his death in 1801. Alleyne family traditions hold that Sir John planted the impressive mahogany avenue leading to Cherry Tree Hill.

St Nicholas Abbey was owned by the slave-owning ancestors of Britain’s Oscar-nominated actor Benedict Cumberbatch for a good 200 years.

The house passed by marriage to Charles Cave in 1834.

The abbey was no longer a functioning plantation after 1947. Sugar has been grown on the plantation since 1640 and there is still the evidence of the mill and sugar making edifices. Sugar was processed on the property until 1947, the cane is now trucked eight miles to the Portvale Sugar Factory for processing.

His great-great-grandson Lt. Col. Stephen Cave OBE lived there from 1978 until his death in November 2003.

Since 2006, the abbey is owned by local Barbadian architect, Larry Warren. Warren built the St. Nicholas Abbey Heritage Railway on his estate, which was completed by the end of 2018.

Museum 
St Nicholas Abbey is currently a museum, successfully recreating 18th-century plantation life complete with; Wedgwood pottery, Chippendale furniture, curvilinear Dutch gables with tall finials of carved coral stone and corner chimneys. The entrance portico, Chinese Chippendale staircase and cedar panelling are later additions to the home. The fireplaces and walled Medieval herb garden were almost certainly included in the original plans brought from England, and copied faithfully.

There is a rare 1930s film of life on a sugar plantation that is available for viewing in the museum. Listed by the Barbados Tourism Authority as one of the "Seven Wonders of Barbados," the property has attracted several thousand visitors a year. Amongst the mahogany trees are box, cabbage palm, silk cotton, and avocado trees.

Literature 
 St. Nicholas Abbey. Tour guide. 350 years of heritage preserved for future generations., [16 pages without numbers], preface from Larry Warren, St. Peter, Barbados, [without date, 2018?]

References

External links
Official website
Spaces in between : archaeological investigations at St. Nicholas Abbey sugar plantation
7 Wonders of Barbados

Jacobean architecture
Architecture in Barbados
Houses in Barbados
History of the Colony of Barbados
Saint Peter, Barbados
Agriculture in Barbados
Sugar plantations in Barbados